Chiton is a genus of chitons, a polyplacophoran mollusk in the family Chitonidae.

Taxonomy
The genus Chiton has been split into several subgenera as follows:
 Subgenus Chiton (Chiton) Linnaeus, 1758
 Chiton (Chiton) albolineatus Broderip & Sowerby, 1829
 Chiton (Chiton) articulatus Sowerby in Broderip & Sowerby, 1832
 Chiton (Chiton) bowenii King & Broderip, 1831
 Chiton (Chiton) ceylanicus E. A. Smith, 1904
 Chiton (Chiton) connectens Thiele, 1909
 Chiton (Chiton) cumingsii Frembly, 1827
 Chiton (Chiton) glaucus Gray, 1828
 Chiton (Chiton) granoradiatus Leloup, 1937
 Chiton (Chiton) granosus Frembly, 1827 (nomen nudum)
 Chiton (Chiton) groschi Kaas, 1979
 Chiton (Chiton) kaasi (Leloup, 1981)
 Chiton (Chiton) laterorugosus Kaas, 1986
 Chiton (Chiton) magnificus (Deshayes, 1844)
 Chiton (Chiton) marmoratus Gmelin, 1791
 Chiton (Chiton) marquesanus Pilsbry, 1893
 Chiton (Chiton) squamosus Linnaeus, 1764
 Chiton (Chiton) stokesii Broderip in Broderip & Sowerby, 1832
 Chiton (Chiton) tuberculatus Linnaeus, 1758 – West Indian green chiton
 Chiton (Chiton) virgulatus Sowerby, 1840
 Chiton (Chiton) viridis Spengler, 1797
 Subgenus Chiton (Mucrosquama) (Iredale & Hull, 1926)
 Chiton (Mucrosquama) carnosus Carpenter in Angas, 1867
 Chiton (Mucrosquama) particolor (Hull, 1923)
 Chiton (Mucrosquama) verconis Torr & Ashby, 1898
 Subgenus Chiton (Rhyssoplax) (Thiele, 1893)
 Chiton (Rhyssoplax) affinis Issel, 1869
 Chiton (Rhyssoplax) baliensis (Bullock, 1989)
 Chiton (Rhyssoplax) barnardi Ashby, 1931
 Chiton (Rhyssoplax) bednalli Pilsbry, 1895
 Chiton (Rhyssoplax) burmanus Carpenter in Pilsbry, 1893
 Chiton (Rhyssoplax) calliozonus Pilsbry, 1894
 Chiton (Rhyssoplax) canariensis d'Orbigny, 1839
 Chiton (Rhyssoplax) corallinus (Risso, 1826)
 Chiton (Rhyssoplax) corypheus Hedley & Hull, 1912
 Chiton (Rhyssoplax) coxi Pilsbry, 1894
 Chiton (Rhyssoplax) crawfordi Sykes, 1899
 Chiton (Rhyssoplax) densiliratus Carpenter in Pilsbry, 1893
 Chiton (Rhyssoplax) diaphorus (Iredale & May, 1916)
 Chiton (Rhyssoplax) discolor Souverbie in Souverbie & Montrouzier, 1866
 Chiton (Rhyssoplax) ectypus (de Rochebrune, 1884)
 Chiton (Rhyssoplax) exasperatus (Iredale, 1914)
 Chiton (Rhyssoplax) exoptandus Bednall, 1897
 Chiton (Rhyssoplax) fosteri Bullock, 1972
 Chiton (Rhyssoplax) funereus Hedley & Hull, 1912
 Chiton (Rhyssoplax) heterodon (Pilsbry, 1893)
 Chiton (Rhyssoplax) jugosus Gould, 1846
 Chiton (Rhyssoplax) kimberi Ashby, 1928
 Chiton (Rhyssoplax) kurodai Is. & Iw. Taki, 1929
 Chiton (Rhyssoplax) linsleyi (Burghardt, 1973)
 Chiton (Rhyssoplax) mauritianus Quoy & Gaimard, 1835
 Chiton (Rhyssoplax) olivaceus Spengler, 1797
 Chiton (Rhyssoplax) oruktus Maughan, 1900
 Chiton (Rhyssoplax) peregrinus Thiele, 1909
 Chiton (Rhyssoplax) perviridis Carpenter, 1865
 Chiton (Rhyssoplax) phaseolinus di Monterosato, 1879
 Chiton (Rhyssoplax) politus Spengler, 1797
 Chiton (Rhyssoplax) pulvinatus Carpenter in Pilsbry, 1893
 Chiton (Rhyssoplax) rapaitiensis Schwabe & Lozouet, 2006
 Chiton (Rhyssoplax) rhynchotus (de Rochebrune, 1884)
 Chiton (Rhyssoplax) salihafui Bullock, 1972
 Chiton (Rhyssoplax) speciosus Nierstrasz, 1905
 Chiton (Rhyssoplax) subassimilis Souverbie in Souverbie & Montrouzier, 1866
 Chiton (Rhyssoplax) tectiformis (Is. Taki, 1938)
 Chiton (Rhyssoplax) torrianus Hedley & Hull, 1910
 Chiton (Rhyssoplax) translucens Hedley & Hull, 1909
 Chiton (Rhyssoplax) tricostalis Pilsbry, 1894
 Chiton (Rhyssoplax) vauclusensis Hedley & Hull, 1909
 Chiton (Rhyssoplax) whitleyi (Iredale & Hull, 1932)
Subgenus Chiton (Tegulaplax) (Iredale & Hull, 1926)
 Chiton (Tegulaplax) boucheti Kaas, 1989
 Chiton (Tegulaplax) hululensis (Smith E.A. in Gardiner, 1903)
 Chiton (Tegulaplax) pulchrus (Kaas, 1991)

Synonyms:
 Chiton (Chiton) aorangi Creese & O'Neill, 1987: Synonym of Sypharochiton aorangi (Creese & O'Neill, 1987)
 Chiton (Chiton) lyratus Sowerby, 1840: Synonym of Chiton (Rhyssoplax) canariensis d'Orbigny, 1840
 Chiton (Chiton) pelliserpentis Quoy & Gaimard, 1835: Synonym of Sypharochiton pelliserpentis (Quoy & Gaimard, 1835)
 Chiton (Chiton) themeropis (Iredale, 1914): Synonym of Sypharochiton themeropis Iredale, 1914
 Chiton (Chiton) torri Suter, 1907: Synonym of Sypharochiton torri (Suter, 1907)
 Chiton (Rhyssoplax) aereus Reeve, 1847: Synonym of Rhyssoplax aerea (Reeve, 1847)
 Chiton (Rhyssoplax) bullocki (Sirenko, 2012): Synonym of Rhyssoplax bullocki Sirenko, 2012
 Chiton (Rhyssoplax) canaliculatus Quoy & Gaimard, 1835: Synonym of Rhyssoplax canaliculata (Quoy & Gaimard, 1835)
 Chiton (Rhyssoplax) komaianus Is. & Iw. Taki, 1929: Synonym of Rhyssoplax komaiana (Is. & Iw. Taki, 1929)
 Chiton (Rhyssoplax) maldivensis (E. A. Smith, 1903): Synonym of Rhyssoplax maldivensis (E. A. Smith, 1903)
 Chiton (Rhyssoplax) pulcherrimus Sowerby, 1842: Synonym of Rhyssoplax pulcherrima (Sowerby, 1842)
 Chiton (Rhyssoplax) stangeri Reeve, 1847: Synonym of Rhyssoplax stangeri (Reeve, 1847)
 Chiton (Rhyssoplax) venustus (Hull, 1923): Synonym of Rhyssoplax venusta Hull, 1923
 Chiton laevigatus Flemming, 1828: Synonym of Tonicella marmorea (O. Fabricius, 1780) 
 Chiton striatus Barnes, 1824: Synonym of Chiton (Rhyssoplax) olivaceus Spengler, 1797
 Chiton tulipa Quoy & Gaimard, 1835: Synonym of Chiton (Rhyssoplax) politus Spengler, 1797

References

External links
 Linnaeus, C. (1758). Systema Naturae per regna tria naturae, secundum classes, ordines, genera, species, cum characteribus, differentiis, synonymis, locis. Editio decima, reformata (10th revised edition), vol. 1: 824 pp. Laurentius Salvius: Holmiae.
  Gofas, S.; Le Renard, J.; Bouchet, P. (2001). Mollusca. in: Costello, M.J. et al. (eds), European Register of Marine Species: a check-list of the marine species in Europe and a bibliography of guides to their identification. Patrimoines Naturels. 50: 180-213
 Neave, Sheffield Airey. (1939-1996). Nomenclator Zoologicus vol. 1-10 Online
 
 Powell A W B, New Zealand Mollusca, William Collins Publishers Ltd, Auckland, New Zealand 1979 

Chitonidae
Carboniferous first appearances